Refuge is an unincorporated community in Houston County, Texas.

References

Unincorporated communities in Houston County, Texas
Unincorporated communities in Texas